Sankhenre Sewadjtu was the thirty-fourth pharaoh of the Thirteenth Dynasty of Egypt during the Second Intermediate Period. Sewadjtu reigned from Memphis, starting in 1675 BC and for a period of 3 years and 2 to 4 months.

Attestations
Sankhenre Sewadjtu is unknown from contemporary historical records, and is exclusively attested by the Turin canon. This may be because he ruled Egypt at a time when the 13th Dynasty's control over  Egypt was receding. He is listed as the successor of Ini in the Turin Canon, on column 7 line 5, and is given a reign of 3 years and 2 to 4 months in this document.

Kim Ryholt proposes that Sankhenre Sewadjtu is attested on the Karnak king list under a different name owing to a scribal error. Indeed, two prenomina Sewadjenre (#33, 59) and two prenomina Snefer[...]re (# 42, 60) are recorded in this list but Ryholt points out that, in each case, only one king with such prenomen is known. Ryholt thus proposes that the two remaining names refer to Sankhenre Sewadjtu and Seankhenre Mentuhotepi. Indeed, Ryholt notes that wadj, nfr and ankh resemble each other in hieratic.

Chronological position
The exact chronological position of Sankhenre Sewadjtu in the 13th Dynasty is not known for certain owing to uncertainties affecting earlier kings of the dynasty. Darrell Baker makes him the thirty-fourth pharaoh of the dynasty, Kim Ryholt sees him as the thirty-fifth king and Jürgen von Beckerath places him as the twenty-ninth pharaoh of the dynasty.

References

17th-century BC Pharaohs
Pharaohs of the Thirteenth Dynasty of Egypt